Persicaria nepalensis is a species of flowering plant in the family Polygonaceae, native to eastern Africa, including Madagascar, and parts of Asia. It has been introduced elsewhere: parts of Europe (including Great Britain), North America (including British Columbia, Connecticut, Massachusetts, New York and Pennsylvania) and northern South America. The species was first described as Polygonum nepalense by Carl Meissner in 1826, and transferred to Persicaria by Hugo Gross in 1913.

References

nepalensis
Flora of Africa
Flora of Madagascar
Flora of temperate Asia
Flora of tropical Asia
Plants described in 1826